Norway was represented by Tor Endresen, with the song "San Francisco", at the 1997 Eurovision Song Contest, which took place on 3 May in Dublin. "San Francisco" was chosen as the Norwegian entry at the Melodi Grand Prix on 8 March, and is mainly remembered for bringing Norway's recent run of Eurovision success – they had finished 5th, 6th, 1st and 2nd in the previous four contests – to a spectacular end.

Before Eurovision

Melodi Grand Prix 1997 
Melodi Grand Prix 1997 was the Norwegian national final that selected Norway's entry for the Eurovision Song Contest 1997.

Competing entries 
350 submissions were received by NRK. Eight songs were selected for the competition by a three-member jury panel. Among the competing artists, Geir Rønning would later represent Finland in the Eurovision Song Contest 2005.

Final 
The final took place on 8 February 1997 at the Studio 2 of NRK, hosted by Tande-P. The winner was selected by a combination of public televoting (60%) and a jury panel (40%), which led to the victory of Tor Endresen on his eighth attempt at the competition. The jury consisted of H.C. Andersen, Elisabeth Andreassen, Kari Gjærum, Ole Evenrud, Leif Erik Forberg and Frode Viken. Several of the jury members were friends of Endresen and Andreassen later told the press that "Endresen deserved to win" regardless of what song he participated with.

At Eurovision 
Heading into the final of the contest, RTÉ reported that bookmakers ranked the entry 17th out of the 25 entries. On the night of the final Endresen performed third in the running order, following Turkey and preceding Austria. At the close of voting "San Francisco" had failed to pick up any points at all, the eighth time Norway had found itself at the bottom of the scoreboard at the end of the evening, and a record fourth nul-points finish. The 1997 ignominy was shared with Portugal, who had also been completely shunned by the national juries. The Norwegian jury awarded its 12 points to France.

Voting
Norway did not receive any points at the 1997 Eurovision Song Contest.

References 

1997
Countries in the Eurovision Song Contest 1997
1997
Eurovision
Eurovision